Aaron Carroll (born in New Zealand) is a New Zealand rugby union player who plays for the  in Super Rugby. His playing position is lock. He was a late addition to the Blues squad for the 2020 season.

Reference list

External links
itsrugby.co.uk profile

New Zealand rugby union players
Living people
Rugby union locks
1993 births
US Carcassonne players
Bay of Plenty rugby union players
Blues (Super Rugby) players
Thames Valley rugby union players
Rugby union players from Tauranga